PSSH may refer to:

Cognitive Science
 Physical symbol system

Organizations
 Socialist Party of Albania

Digital Rights Management standards
 Protection System Specific Header

Parallel SSH command line tool 
 Parallel SSH